Sjinkie Knegt (born 5 July 1989) is a Dutch short track speed skater.

Career
He competed for the Netherlands at the 2010 Winter Olympics in the men's 500 m, 1000 m, and 1500m.  At the January 2014 European Short Track Speed Skating Championships, he was disqualified from the 5000m relay final after making an obscene hand gesture at first-place finisher Victor Ahn of Russia. At the 2014 Sochi Olympics, he won a bronze medal in the 1000 meter race. This was the first medal for the Netherlands at the Olympics in short track.

In 2015 Knegt won both the European and world titles in the overall competition.

At the 2018 Pyeongchang Olympics, Knegt won the silver medal in the men's 1500 metres race.

References

External links

1989 births
Living people
Dutch male short track speed skaters
Olympic short track speed skaters of the Netherlands
Olympic medalists in short track speed skating
Olympic silver medalists for the Netherlands
Olympic bronze medalists for the Netherlands
Short track speed skaters at the 2010 Winter Olympics
Short track speed skaters at the 2014 Winter Olympics
Short track speed skaters at the 2018 Winter Olympics
Short track speed skaters at the 2022 Winter Olympics
Medalists at the 2014 Winter Olympics
Medalists at the 2018 Winter Olympics
Sportspeople from Friesland
People from De Fryske Marren
World Short Track Speed Skating Championships medalists
20th-century Dutch people
21st-century Dutch people